Joseph Wilson Prueher (born November 25, 1942) is a former admiral of the United States Navy who was United States Ambassador to the People's Republic of China from 1999 to 2001. He was succeeded as ambassador by Clark T. Randt Jr.

Early life

A native of Tennessee where he was born in 1942, Prueher attended Montgomery Bell Academy in Nashville and graduated from the U.S. Naval Academy. He also obtained a master's degree in international affairs from George Washington University's Elliott School of International Affairs.

Career

Prueher started his career in the United States Navy as Midshipman at the U.S. Naval Academy in 1960. He flew as an A-6 Intruder in the Vietnam War. In the later part of his career, he was the seventy-third Commandant of Midshipmen at the U.S. Naval Academy.

Prueher attained the rank of admiral as Commander Carrier Group One in 1991. He was appointed Commander of the U.S. Sixth Fleet from 1993 to 1995. He was Vice Chief of Naval Operations from 1995 to 1996, and Commander-in-Chief of the United States Pacific Command from 1996 to 1999.

He was posted as ambassador to China from November 1999 to May 2001. Prueher negotiated the settlement and delivered the "letter of the two sorries" which defused the Hainan Island incident in 2001. He then joined Stanford University's Institute of International Studies as Consulting Professor in 2001.

Prueher is currently the James R. Schlesinger Distinguished Professor at the Miller Center of the University of Virginia, as well as Senior Advisor to the Stanford-Harvard Preventive Defense Project, working on dialogue for US-China security matters.

Awards and decorations

In December 1998 he was appointed an Honorary Officer of the Order of Australia, "for distinguished service in the promotion of Australian and United States of America Defence relations".

In 1997, he was honored with the Naval War College Distinguished Graduate Leadership Award and, in 2001, Distinguished Alumni Achievement Award by George Washington University.

Post-government career 

Prueher is a director of Fluor Corporation, Irving, Texas; Emerson Electric Co., St. Louis, Missouri; and AMERIGROUP Corporation, Virginia Beach, Virginia.

References

External links
Joseph W. Prueher profile at Forbes.com
Joseph Prueher profile at CISAC/Stanford

Living people
Ambassadors of the United States to China
United States Naval Academy alumni
United States Naval Aviators
United States Navy admirals
Recipients of the Legion of Merit
Elliott School of International Affairs alumni
Honorary Officers of the Order of Australia
1942 births
Clinton administration cabinet members
20th-century American politicians
Recipients of the Air Medal
Recipients of the Distinguished Flying Cross (United States)
Vice Chiefs of Naval Operations
Recipients of the Defense Distinguished Service Medal
Recipients of the Navy Distinguished Service Medal
20th-century American naval officers